Susan Ustin is an American earth scientist who is the Distinguished Professor of Environmental Resource Science at the John Muir Institute for the Environment, University of California, Davis. Her research makes use of remote sensing technology to understand the characteristics of plant communities.

Early life and education 
Ustin is from Eugene, Oregon. After graduating from high school in 1961, Ustin moved to San Francisco with her friends. She was inspired by the city's activism, in particular the civil rights movement and environmental advocates. She first studied biology at California State University, East Bay, specialising in plant physiological ecology. She remained there for a master's degree, before moving to the University of California, Davis for her doctoral degree. Alongside her doctoral research Ustin started working at the Jet Propulsion Laboratory. She started working on remote sensing technology in the early 1980s, when the field was then in its infancy.

Research and career 
Her work considers remote sensing of environmental and landscape properties, making use of hyperspectral analysis and thermal scanners. Remote sensing has since been used to monitor natural disasters, study climate changes and monitor air pollution. Over the course of her career, Ustin made use of remote sensing data from five different continents, including tracking the impacts of agriculture on forests and monitoring invasive plant species.

Ustin held several positions at University of California, Davis, including serving as Director of both the Center for Spatial Technology and Remote Sensing and the John Muir Institute of the Environment. She worked with NASA to build space-based imaging spectrometers.

In 2020 Ustin was elected to the Ecological Society of America. Her citation read, “Elected for research pioneering the use of remote sensing technology for detecting changes in plant community characteristics, biological diversity, and land use, and for her continued influence on the field,”.

Awards 

 2010 Honorary Doctorate from the University of Zurich
 2017 Elected Fellow of the American Geophysical Union
 2020 Elected Fellow of the Ecological Society of America

Selected publications

Books

References 

Living people
Year of birth missing (living people)
American earth scientists
University of California, Davis faculty
Fellows of the American Geophysical Union
Fellows of the Ecological Society of America
California State University, East Bay alumni